Květa Hrdličková and Helena Vildová won in the final 6–3, 6–2 against Åsa Carlsson and Seda Noorlander.

Seeds
Champion seeds are indicated in bold text while text in italics indicates the round in which those seeds were eliminated.

 Virág Csurgó /  Laura Golarsa (withdrew)
 Svetlana Krivencheva /  Petra Langrová (quarterfinals)
 Barbara Rittner /  Elena Wagner (quarterfinals)
 Aleksandra Olsza /  Caroline Schneider (first round)

Draw

External links
 1998 Prokom Polish Open Draw

Women's Doubles
Doubles